Pedro Flores born (March 9, 1894 – July 14, 1979) was one of Puerto Rico's best known composers of ballads and boleros.

Early Years 
Flores (birth name: Pedro Juan Flores Córdova) was one of twelve children born into a poor family in the town of Naguabo, Puerto Rico. Flores' father died when he was only nine years old, necessitating that he had to work from a young age.  When Flores was sixteen years old, he took a special course at the University of Puerto Rico (Universidad de Puerto Rico) and received his teachers’ certificate. Flores then taught for five years and worked for one year at a sugar mill om the island of Vieques. In 1918, he served in a clerical position in the United States Army. He was honorably discharged from the Army when he was twenty-four years old.

Trío Borinquen
In 1926, Flores went to New York City without any formal musical education. There, he  joined another Puerto Rican composer,  Rafael Hernández, in his Trío Borinquen.  Even though Flores and Hernández became very good friends, they also became competitors as composers.  When Flores wrote "Sin Bandera", Hernández rushed to write  Preciosa.

In 1930, Flores formed his own trio which he named "Trío Galón", and whose music and had a faster beat than the "Trío Borinquen".  Flores had problems with the music publishing company and he consequently abandoned the trio.  He moved to Mexico and then lived in Cuba for a short period of time.  Flores eventually returned to New York where he reconstituted his former trio.  Some of the singers of this new trio were Myrta Silva, Daniel Santos and Pedro Ortiz Dávila, known as "Davilita".

Musical compositions

Some of the songs written by Flores were:Obsesión, Amor Perdido (Lost Love), Bajo un Palmar (Under A Palm Tree), Borracho no Vale (which may translate to Drunk Doesn't Count or Doesn't Count If You're Drunk), Linda, Sin Bandera (Without a Flag), Despedida (Farewell) and Perdón (I'm Sorry).
Among those who have performed his songs are Beny More, Los Panchos, Celia Cruz, and María Luisa Landín. A 1996 television special honoring his work features versions by many Puerto Rican and international artists, such as Ednita Nazario, Marc Anthony, Yolandita Monge and Shakira.

Selected discography
 "Despedida",  single Nelson Navarro 1967

Later years
Pedro Flores died in San Juan, Puerto Rico on July 14, 1979, and is buried in Santa María Magdalena de Pazzis Cemetery located in Old San Juan

See also

 List of Puerto Ricans
 List of Puerto Rican songwriters

Notes

References

External links
 Popular Culture
 Peer Music biography

1894 births
1979 deaths
Burials at Santa María Magdalena de Pazzis Cemetery
People from Naguabo, Puerto Rico
20th-century Puerto Rican musicians
Puerto Rican composers
Puerto Rican male composers
United States Army soldiers
20th-century American composers
20th-century American male musicians